There are four communities named Sunset Beach in the Canadian province of Ontario. Each is located in a different municipality:

Amherstburg
Ashfield–Colborne–Wawanosh
Muskoka Lakes
Tay